Joannes Bassianus was an Italian jurist of the 12th century.

Life
Little is known of his origin, but he is said by his jurist contemporary Carolus de Tocco (Carlo di Tocco) to have been a native of Cremona. He was a professor in the law school of Bologna, the pupil of Bulgarus, and the master of Azo. The most important of his writings which have been preserved in his Summary on the Authentica, which Savigny regarded as one of the most precious works of the Glossators.

Joannes, as he is generally termed, was remarkable for his talent in inventing ingenious forms for explaining his ideas with greater precision, and perhaps his most celebrated work is his "Law-Tree," which he entitled Arbor Actionum, and which has been the subject of numerous commentaries. The work presents a tree, upon the branches of which the various kinds of actions are arranged after the manner of fruit. The civil actions, or actiones stricti juris, being forty-eight in number, are arranged on one side, whilst the equitable or praetorian ' actions, in number one hundred and twenty-one, are arranged on the other side.

A further scientific division of actions was made by him under twelve heads, and by an ingenious system of notation the student was enabled to class at once each of the civil or praetorian actions, as the case might be, under its proper head in the scientific division. By the side of the tree a few glosses were added by Joannes to explain and justify his classification. His Lectures on the Pandects and the Code, which were collected by his pupil Nicolaus Furiosus, have unfortunately perished.

References 

Attribution

Further reading 
 Francis Zulueta and Peter Stein, eds., "Introduction," The Teaching of Roman Law in England Around 1200 The Selden Society, 1990

External links
Works of Joannes Bassianus at ParalipomenaIuris

Bassianus
12th-century Latin writers